Hot Gimmick: Girl Meets Boy is a 2019 Japanese coming-of-age romance film written and directed by Yūki Yamato. The film stars Mizuki Itagaki, Miona Hori and Hiroya Shimizu in the lead roles. The film is based on the manga series, Hot Gimmick. The film had its theatrical release on 28 June 2019 and received negative reviews from critics. It was also streamed via Netflix on 28 December 2019.

Synopsis 

Hatsumi Narita (Miona Hori) is an ordinary high school girl. She shares an apartment with her adopted older brother, Shinogu Narita (Shotaro Mamiya), and biological younger sister Akane Narita (Hiyori Sakurada), and parents. One day, she allows the neighbourhood teenage boy Ryoki Tachibana (Hiroya Shimizu) who also lives in the same apartment building to see her. However things go wrong for Hatsumi as Ryoki takes advantage of her weakness and blackmails her to get his wishes fulfilled. Suddenly Hatsumi's neighbour/childhood friend, Azusa Odagiri (Mizuki Itagaki) comes to see Hatsumi and it causes further trouble for Hatsumi as she is bullied and blackmailed by both boys.

Cast
 Miona Hori as Hatsumi Narita
 Shotaro Mamiya as Shinogu Narita
 Hiyori Sakurada as Akane Narita
 Hiroya Shimizu as Ryoki Tachibana
 Mizuki Itagaki as Azusa Odagiri
 Riho Yoshioka as Rina Katsuragi
 Kaisei Kamimura as Subaru Yagi

Production 
The film announcement was made by director Yûki Yamato in 2018 stating that the film would be a live-action film based on the manga series, Hot Gimmick. Principal photography of the film was commenced on 24 September 2018 and shooting of the film concluded in October 2018. On 25 September 2018, Aihara posted regarding the details of the film on her blog. On 17 December 2018, Toei Company, the film's distributor, confirmed the release date as June 28, 2019. On March 14, 2019, the film's full title was revealed to be Hot Gimmick: Girl Meets Boy. and the subtitle was kept as Girl Meets Boy in order to avoid the confusion with the manga Hot Gimmick.

References

External links 
 

2010s coming-of-age films
2010s Japanese films
2019 romantic drama films
2019 films
Japanese coming-of-age films
Japanese romantic drama films
2010s Japanese-language films
Japanese-language Netflix original films
Live-action films based on manga
Toei Company films